Pratt Field was the home of the Texas Collegiate League Mineral Wells Steam from 2004 to 2007 and is located in Mineral Wells, Texas. The field is located next to the Mineral Wells High School.

References

External links
 Mineral Wells ISD Athletics

Baseball venues in Texas
Buildings and structures in Palo Pinto County, Texas